Bang Bua Thong is one of the eight subdistricts (tambon) of Bang Bua Thong District, in Nonthaburi Province, Thailand. Neighbouring subdistricts are (clockwise from north) Lahan, Phimon Rat, Sano Loi, Phimon Rat and Sai Noi. In 2020 it had a total population of 62,632 people.

Administration

Central administration
The subdistrict is subdivided into 14 administrative villages (muban).

Local administration
The area of the subdistrict is shared by two local administrative organizations.
Bang Bua Thong Town Municipality
Mai Bang Bua Thong Town Municipality

References

External links
Website of Bang Bua Thong Town Municipality
Website of Mai Bang Bua Thong Town Municipality

Tambon of Nonthaburi province
Populated places in Nonthaburi province